EVERYTHING IS GOING TO BE ALRIGHT is a series of installations by British artist Martin Creed. Each installation consists solely of the artwork title, formed in large neon letters and is numbered individually in Creed's catalogue. The artworks have been described as one of Creed's most iconic works.

Works
The first installation to be given this title was Work No. 203 (1999), a temporary commission for the Clapton Portico in Hackney, London. Since then, a series of similar artworks have been installed in different social and geographical settings around the world, including:

Creed has since used neon lettering in several artworks spelling other phrases, including "DON'T WORRY" and "MOTHERS".

Reaction
The installation has been described as 'visually spectacular'. Tate Britain curator Debra Lennard described the artworks as "tak[ing] on slightly different inflections according to the circumstances of their display". While some reviewers have noted the hopeful and familiar tone of the phrase, others have interpreted the artwork as suggesting that "everything might not be alright" and an "ironic comment on today’s consumer-driven world".

Gallery

References

Installation art works
Light art
Works by Martin Creed